The 2011–12 season was Dumbarton's third consecutive season in the Scottish Second Division, having been promoted from the Scottish Third Division at the end of the 2008–09 season. Dumbarton also competed in the Challenge Cup, League Cup and Scottish Cup.

Summary
Dumbarton finished third in the Second Division, entering the play-offs winning 6–2 against Airdrie United on aggregate in the final and were promoted to the Scottish First Division. They reached the second round of the Challenge Cup, the first round of the League Cup and the third round of the Scottish Cup.

Results & fixtures

Pre-season matches

Scottish Challenge Cup

Scottish League Cup

Scottish Second Division

First Division play-offs

Scottish Cup

Stirlingshire Cup

Player statistics

Captains

Squad 
Last updated 26 May 2012

|}
a.  Includes other competitive competitions, including the play-offs and the 2011–12 Scottish Challenge Cup.

Disciplinary record
Includes all competitive matches. 
Last updated 26 May 2012

Awards
Last updated 27 February 2012

Team statistics

League table

Transfers

Players in

Players out

Factfile
 The League match against Airdrie United on 21 January marked Ryan Borris's 100th appearance for Dumbarton in all national competitions - the 132nd Dumbarton player to reach this milestone.

See also
List of Dumbarton F.C. seasons

References

External links
Arnaud Gastal (Dumbarton Football Club Historical Archive)
Robert Connolly (Dumbarton Football Club Historical Archive)
Jamie Lyden (Dumbarton Football Club Historical Archive)
Dominic Kennedy (Dumbarton Football Club Historical Archive)
Martin McBride (Dumbarton Football Club Historical Archive)
Adam Monaghan (Dumbarton Football Club Historical Archive)
Gary McKell (Dumbarton Football Club Historical Archive)
David Gray (Dumbarton Football Club Historical Archive)
Arlan Kadina Mpata (Dumbarton Football Club Historical Archive)
Glen Thomson (Dumbarton Football Club Historical Archive)
John Hempstead (Dumbarton Football Club Historical Archive)

Dumbarton F.C. seasons
Scottish football clubs 2011–12 season